Ivan Ivanov (born April 27, 1979) is a Kyrgyz former swimmer, who specialized in long-distance freestyle events. He is a single-time Olympian and a former Kyrgyzstani record holder in the 400 and 1500 m freestyle.

Ivanov competed in a long-distance freestyle double at the 2000 Summer Olympics in Sydney. He posted FINA B-standards of 4:04.35 (400 m freestyle) and 16:10.15 (1500 m freestyle) from the Russian National Championships in Moscow. On the first day of the Games, Ivanov placed forty-fifth in the 400 m freestyle. Swimming in heat one, he held off Nicaragua's Marcelino López by almost ten seconds to take a fifth spot in 4:09.33. Four days later, in the 4×200 m freestyle relay, Ivanov, along with Andrei Pakin, Aleksandr Shilin, and Dmitri Kuzmin, were disqualified from heat one for an early takeoff during the lead-off leg. In his final event, 1500 m freestyle, Ivanov participated in the same heat against Czech Republic's Vlastimil Burda and Chinese Taipei's Li Yun-lun. Before the start of the program's longest race, Ivanov was cast out of the field for a "no false-start" rule, leaving Burda and Li as the only two men standing.

References

External links
 

1979 births
Living people
Kyrgyzstani male freestyle swimmers
Olympic swimmers of Kyrgyzstan
Swimmers at the 2000 Summer Olympics
Sportspeople from Bishkek
Kyrgyzstani people of Russian descent
20th-century Kyrgyzstani people
21st-century Kyrgyzstani people